Pål Berrefjord (born 11 April 1977 in Bergen) is a Norwegian politician for the Labour Party.

He served in the position of deputy representative to the Parliament of Norway from Hordaland during the term 2001–2005. In total he met during 55 days of parliamentary session.

References

1977 births
Living people
Deputy members of the Storting
Labour Party (Norway) politicians
Politicians from Bergen
21st-century Norwegian politicians